Heerji Bhai  is an Indian politician. He was elected to the Lok Sabha, the lower house of the Parliament of India, from Banswara in Rajasthan, as a member of the Indian National Congress.

References

External links
Official biographical sketch in Parliament of India website

India MPs 1967–1970
Lok Sabha members from Rajasthan
1941 births
Living people
Indian National Congress politicians from Rajasthan